James Michael Longuski (born 1951) is an American scientist, inventor, writer, and educator known for his contributions to astrodynamics and space mission design. After working as a space mission designer at Jet Propulsion Laboratory (JPL) for NASA, Longuski has served as a professor at Purdue University School of Aeronautics and Astronautics since 1988.

Education
Longuski received his PhD in Aerospace Engineering from the University of Michigan in 1979 supervised by Nguyễn Xuân Vinh.

Career and research
In the late 1990s together with Nathan Strange of JPL, he developed the method and coined the term, the “Tisserand graph,”  widely used for gravity-assist spacecraft trajectory design (a concept independently introduced by Labunsky et al.). He also developed the technique and coined the term, “V-Infinity Leveraging,” which uses a deep space maneuver to leverage (increase or decrease) the hyperbolic velocity at the next gravity-assist body.

Longuski began work on Mars cycler trajectories in 1985 when Buzz Aldrin visited JPL looking for verification of his proposed trajectory now known as the Aldrin cycler. The concept involves placing a large spacecraft (or astronaut hotel) in orbit around the Sun that continually flies by Mars and Earth , providing a permanent human transportation system between those planets. Longuski was able to verify Aldrin's concept and together they developed several versions of cycler trajectories.

In 2001, Longuski with Ephraim Fischbach and Daniel Scheeres proposed a test of Albert Einstein's General Theory of Relativity based on spacecraft trajectories. Longuski is co-inventor with Dan Javorsek of a Method of Velocity Precision Pointing in Spin-Stabilized Spacecraft or Rockets.

Quotes

Books 
Longuski has published four books: 

 Advice to Rocket Scientists
 The Seven Secrets of How to Think Like a Rocket Scientist 
 Optimal Control with Aerospace Applications
 Introduction to Orbital Perturbations

References

American scientists
Purdue University faculty
Jet Propulsion Laboratory faculty
Living people
1951 births
University of Michigan College of Engineering alumni